Bayou Meto is a river in Arkansas, U.S.

Bayou Meto may also refer to the following places in the U.S.:

 Bayou Meto, Arkansas County, Arkansas
 Bayou Meto, Lonoke County, Arkansas
 Bayou Meto Elementary School, Jacksonville North Pulaski School District, Arkansas

See also
 Bayou (disambiguation)
 Battle of Bayou Meto, during the American Civil War
 Bayou Meto Battlefield